State Route 244 (SR 244), also known as Boonshill–Petersburg Road, is a  north–south state highway in northern Lincoln County, Tennessee, that connects the community of Boonshill with the town of Petersburg.

Route description

SR 244 begins in the Boonshill community at an intersection with US 64/SR 15. It heads northeast through farmland and hilly terrain to pass by Unity School before passing through rural areas for several miles before coming to an end at the southern edge of the Petersburg city limits at an intersection with US 431/SR 50. The entire route SR 244 is a rural two-lane highway.

Major intersections

References

244
Transportation in Lincoln County, Tennessee